The University of Kassel is a university founded in 1971 located in Kassel, Hessen, in central Germany. As of February 2022 it had about 25,000 students and about 3300 staff, including more than 300 professors.

A special unit (Studienkolleg) prepares international students for their period of study (language and academic skills). International students come from over 115 countries.

Each academic year, more than 100 visiting scholars pursue research projects in cooperation with colleagues from the University of Kassel, making a valuable contribution to the academic and cultural life. The newly established International House is located on the campus. It offers hostels for international guests and is available for meetings, conferences, and cultural events.

Precincts

In addition to the central campus Holländischer Platz, the University of Kassel has the other campuses Heinrich-Plett-Straße, Menzelstraße, Wilhelmshöher Allee and Damaschkestraße in Kassel as well as two campuses in the town of Witzenhausen (about 40 kilometres east).

Schools

A wide range of undergraduate and postgraduate study programmes is offered in the following fields of study. All study programmes are open to German and international students alike. A range of degrees can be obtained, including bachelor's and master's degrees, the Artistic Examination, or a Doctorate:

 Natural Sciences
 Engineering Sciences
 Architecture, Urban Planning and Landscape Planning
 International Agriculture and Environmental Protection
 Social Sciences
 Humanities
 Fine Arts

Two Academy Awards (or Oscar) in the area of animation films, plus three nominations, have so far been won by graduates from the Kassel School of Arts, which is part of the university.

Research
Interdisciplinary research is a priority for the University of Kassel. This includes research cooperation and dialogue with international research institutions, such as the Fraunhofer Society. High-profile research includes new materials as well as sustainability. In order to strengthen the latter by adding new chairs, in 2021 the Kassel Institute of Sustainability was founded.

Research fields and cooperation projects also include the Brothers Grimm who spent their most productive years in Kassel and who wrote their famous fairy tales there, and the documenta, the world's most important exhibition of modern art, taking place in Kassel every five years.

Scientists at the Centre for Environmental Systems Research at the University of Kassel have been investigating how Germany can power itself entirely by renewable energy.

Teaching

The University of Kassel has repeatedly been awarded for its teaching.

Influence on regional economy

The region's economic revival of the last two decades has been widely attributed to the university and its encouragement of entrepreneurship. Germany's leading weekly paper Die Zeit called it a role model for universities nationwide.

Library

The library of the University of Kassel serves as a Library of the State of Hessen (an important function in the German system of libraries). It was formed by merging the Landesbibliothek (founded 1580 be Landgraf Wilhelm IV of Hessen)  and the Murhardsche Bibliothek (founded 1845 by the testament of scholar Friedrich Wilhelm August Murhard and his brother Friedrich Wilhelm August Murhard and opened 1905 as a city library).

A special focus of the library is the collection of early medieval manuscripts (over 10,000 in the collection) and early prints (mainly from the personal library of the Landgrafen, who devoted themselves to natural history, natural philosophy, astronomy, astrology, and alchemy). A few of the most important items have been digitized.

The two most impressive items of the collection are the Hildebrandslied (from c. 830) and the proof copy of the Children's and Household Tales, the famous fairy tales of the Brothers Grimm (the Kinder – und Hausmärchen der Gebrüder Grimm) (1812/1815), an annotated copy that was chosen as part of the UNESCO Memory of the World in 2005.

The library holds an early medieval text preserved in a manuscript from c. 810 known as the Kassel conversations (in German: Kasseler Gespräche).

Notable people

Scholars
 Volker Braun – Grimm Professor
  – Professor of Sociology
 Ulrike Tikvah Kissmann – Sociologist
 Paul-Gerhard Klumbies – Professor of Biblical Sciences
  – Professor of Bioethics
 Georg Krücken – Professor of Sociology and Higher Education Research
 Ulrich Kutschera – Professor of Evolutionary Biology
 Jan Marco Leimeister – Professor of Business informatics
 Winfried Nöth – Professor of Semiotics
 Petra Schmidt – voice
 Rudolf Schmitt – 19th century scholar
  – Professor of Ancient History
  – Professor of law with focus on privacy protection and digital economy
  – Professor of Business Informations
 Lutz Michael Wegner – Professor of Computer Science
 Christoph Scherrer – Professor of Globalization and Politics
  – Professor of Development and Postcolonial Studies
 Hans-Jürgen Burchardt – Professor of International and Intersocietal Relations
  – Professor of Political Theory

Alumni
 Günther Cramer – Entrepreneur, SMA Technologie
 Thomas Stellmach (b. 1965) – Filmmaker and winner of the Academy Award for the animated motion picture Quest
 Klaus Stern (b. 1968) – Filmmaker and winner of the Adolf-Grimme-Preis for Weltmarktführer (2004), a documentary
 Ines Mergel – Expert in Social Media at The Maxwell School of Citizenship and Public Affairs at Syracuse University
Matthias Berninger – Former member of Bundestag for Die Grünen
Jürgen Osterhammel –  German historian specializing in Chinese and world history, Professor emeritus at the University of Konstanz
Maja Göpel – German political economist, transformation researcher, and sustainability scientist
Gülay Çağlar – Professor of Political Science, Berlin Free University
Kaya Kinkel – politician from Alliance 90/The Greens.

See also 
 Kassel conversations
 List of early modern universities in Europe
 International Summer University (ISU) Kassel
 International Winter University (IWU) Kassel

References

External links 

 
University
Education in Hesse
Universities and colleges in Hesse
Educational institutions established in 1971
1971 establishments in Germany